José Rafael García Torres (born 14 August 1974) is a Mexican former professional footballer and current manager.

As a player, he was a participant in the 2002 FIFA World Cup in South Korea/Japan and the 2006 FIFA World Cup in Germany.

Club career
A midfielder comfortable in the center or on the left side, García began his club career with UNAM in 1992. During the 1994–95 season, he established himself in the Pumas lineup, appearing in 32 matches and scoring 8 goals. In the summer of 1998 he left for Toluca, beginning a six-year stint at the club. At Toluca, García won league titles during the Verano 1999, Verano 2000, and Apertura 2002 seasons, appearing in the finals on each occasion. Playing wide on the left alongside Fabián Estay and Víctor Ruiz in his early years with Toluca, García later formed a central midfield trio with Israel López and Antonio Naelson. In 2004, he moved to Cruz Azul, joined Atlas for one year in 2005, then returned to Cruz Azul briefly before finishing his top-division career in 2008 with Veracruz.

International career
García also earned 52 caps for the Mexico national team, scoring three times. He made his international debut on February 7, 1996, in a 2–1 loss against Chile. In the 1996 U.S. Cup, he scored his first international goal with a bending free kick against the United States at the Rose Bowl. García represented Mexico in four matches of the 1997 Copa América, but missed the 1998 FIFA World Cup. After the appointment of Manuel Lapuente as national coach, García appeared at the 1999 Copa América and the 1999 FIFA Confederations Cup, which Mexico won. Recalled to the team for the 2002 World Cup, he played 14 minutes in the opening-round match against Italy. García remained in the team under new coach Ricardo Antonio Lavolpe, helping Mexico to victory in the 2003 CONCACAF Gold Cup and scoring in the quarterfinal against Jamaica. Although he also played in the 2005 CONCACAF Gold Cup and five qualifying matches for the 2006 FIFA World Cup, he did not play any matches in the 2006 competition itself. García made his final international appearance in a 2–1 loss to the Netherlands on June 1, 2006.  New light has surfaced that nepotism was the reason why he participated in the World Cup games of 2006 as he is a relative of then Coach Ricardo La Volpe.

At junior international levels, García competed for Mexico at the 1991 FIFA U-17 World Championship and 1993 FIFA World Youth Championship, as well as the 1996 Summer Olympics.

International goals
Scores and results list Mexico's goal tally first.

Honours
Toluca
Mexican Primera División: Verano 1998, Verano 1999, Verano 2000, Apertura 2002
Campeón de Campeones: 2003
CONCACAF Champions' Cup: 2003

Mexico
FIFA Confederations Cup: 1999
CONCACAF Gold Cup: 2003

Individual
CONCACAF Gold Cup Best XI: 2003

References

External links
 

1974 births
Living people
Footballers from Mexico City
Association football midfielders
Mexican footballers
Mexico international footballers
Footballers at the 1996 Summer Olympics
1997 Copa América players
1999 Copa América players
1999 FIFA Confederations Cup players
2002 FIFA World Cup players
2003 CONCACAF Gold Cup players
2005 CONCACAF Gold Cup players
2006 FIFA World Cup players
FIFA Confederations Cup-winning players
CONCACAF Gold Cup-winning players
Olympic footballers of Mexico
Club Universidad Nacional footballers
Deportivo Toluca F.C. players
Cruz Azul footballers
Atlas F.C. footballers
C.D. Veracruz footballers
Liga MX players
Mexican football managers
Club Puebla managers
Footballers at the 1995 Pan American Games
Pan American Games silver medalists for Mexico
Pan American Games medalists in football
Medalists at the 1995 Pan American Games